The 2011–12 English Hockey League season took place from September 2011 until April 2012. The women's league received sponsorship from Investec. The Men's Championship was won by Reading and the Women's Championship was won by Leicester.

The Men's Cup was won by Beeston and the Women's Cup was won by the University of Birmingham.

Men's Premier Division League Standings

Results

Play Offs

Women's Investec Premier Division League Standings

Play Offs

Men's Cup

Quarter-finals

Semi-finals

Final
(Held at the Cannock on 13 May)

Women's Cup

Quarter-finals

Semi-finals

Final
(Held at Cannock on 13 May)

References

England Hockey League seasons
field hockey
field hockey
England